Monica Chan Fat-yung (Chinese: 陳法蓉; born 28 October 1966) is a Hong Kong actress and model. She won the Miss Hong Kong 1989 pageant.

Before her acting days, Chan graduated from high school in Canada and attended University of Hawaii. Before she finished her bachelor's degree, she returned to Hong Kong to enter the Miss Hong Kong Pageant. She also gained certificate for diving instructor qualifications.

Career
Monica was signed to TVB after she won the Miss HK beauty pageant. She went on to compete in the Miss Chinese International 1989 where she finished as 1st runner up. She also took part in the international beauty pageant, Miss Universe 1990 where she finished 23rd. After nearly ten years with TVB, she left TVB and joined ATV. She has worked with some popular actors and actresses like Dicky Cheung, Ruby Lin and Anthony Wong. Her last role was in 2005 in The Royal Swordsmen. In the recent years, Monica is less involved with the entertainment industry. While occasionally spotted in award shows and promoting various products as a spokesperson, she hasn't been featured in any HK dramas or movies for several years.

Filmography

Television series

Film

References

External links
 
 Monica Chan at the Hong Kong Cinemagic
 Monica Chan on Sina Weibo

1966 births
20th-century Hong Kong actresses
21st-century Hong Kong actresses
Hong Kong film actresses
Hong Kong television actresses
Living people
Miss Hong Kong winners
Miss Universe 1990 contestants
University of Hawaiʻi alumni